Ginny Shaver is an American politician. She serves as a Republican member of the Alabama House of Representatives for the 39th district. She replaces Richard Lindsey in the seat.
Her husband is the sheriff of Montgomery county.

References

Living people
Republican Party members of the Alabama House of Representatives
Women state legislators in Alabama
Place of birth missing (living people)
Year of birth missing (living people)
21st-century American politicians
21st-century American women politicians